The 2018 European Golf Team Championships was a golf tournament played in August 2018 at Gleneagles, Scotland. It was the inaugural event and consisted of three competitions – men's, women's and mixed team format. 16 two-player teams took part in both men's and women's competitions.

The event was part of the 2018 European Championships, the inaugural edition of the European Championships, a multi-sport event which took place in Berlin, Germany, and Glasgow, Scotland from 2 to 12 August 2018.

Iceland topped the medal table, with a surprise win in the mixed team event the highlight of a campaign that returned two medals. Hosts Great Britain and Sweden both returned two medals, the latter including the gold in the women's team event, while Spain triumphed in the men's team.

The format failed to attract the highest ranked players, with Great Britain's Georgia Hall, ranked 10th in the world, the only player from the top 200 in the World of either sex to participate. No further championships were arranged after the inaugural event, and golf did not reappear in the list of European Championships events in 2022.

Format
The European Golf Team Championships took place at Gleneagles in Scotland from 8−12 August 2018, featuring a 50/50 gender split in the field with male and female professionals competing for equal prize money in a men's team match play championship, a women's team match play championship, and a mixed team 18-hole foursomes stroke play championship.

The field consisted of 16 teams of two players competing in the men's and women's team events, before combining to form teams of four (two men and two women) in the mixed team championship.

The men's and women's team championships featured a round-robin group fourball format, on 8–10 August, with winners of each of the four groups progressing to the semi-finals where foursomes will determine the winners, on 12 August. In the group stage, two points were awarded for a win, one point for a halved match, and no points for a loss. Ties between two teams in the standings were determined by their head-to-head result and if teams were still tied for first place then a sudden-death playoff would occur.

The mixed team championship comprised teams of four (2 men and 2 women) playing in 18-hole mixed foursomes stroke play on 11 August, with combined scores used for team's total score. Ties for medal positions were determined by a sudden-death playoff involving the low-scoring foursome from each team involved.

Qualification
Qualification for the Championships was via the European Golf Team Championships points tables for men and women, which were based on men's Official World Golf Ranking points and women's Women's World Golf Rankings points earned from tournaments finishing between 10 July 2017 and 9 July 2018 with a maximum of three teams representing any one nation in each event.

Competitors
The following competitors were announced for the championships. Rank is the Official World Golf Ranking (men) or Women's World Golf Rankings (women) in the week prior to the championship.

Men

Women

Mixed team

Results

Men's team

Pool play
Teams were divided into 4 groups of 4 teams and played round-robin matches Wednesday to Friday using the fourball format.
Round 1 – 8 August
Round 2 – 9 August
Round 3 – 10 August

Medal bracket
Sunday, 12 August

Women's team

Pool play
Teams were divided into 4 groups of 4 teams and played round-robin matches Wednesday to Friday using the fourball format.
Round 1 – 8 August
Round 2 – 9 August
Round 3 – 10 August

Medal bracket
Sunday, 12 August

Mixed team

The mixed team championship comprised eleven teams of four (2 men and 2 women) playing in 18-hole mixed foursomes stroke play on 11 August, with combined scores used for team's total score. Ties for medal positions were determined by a sudden-death playoff involving the low-scoring foursome from each team involved.

Sweden 2 defeated Spain with a birdie at the first hole of the bronze medal playoff.

Medalists

Medal summary

References

External links

European Championships Glasgow 2018 site
Results book − Golf 
Coverage on the European Tour site
Coverage on the Ladies European Tour site 

 
Team golf tournaments
2018 European Golf Team Championships
2018 European Golf Team Championships
Golf
2018 in golf
2018 in Scottish sport
August 2018 sports events in the United Kingdom